Amygdali (Greek: Αμυγδαλή meaning almond) is a mountain village located west of Karditsa in the western part of the Karditsa regional unit, Greece.  Amygdali is in the municipality of Mouzaki.  Amygdali had a population of 61 in 2011.  Its residents are based in agriculture.

Population

External links
 Amygdali on GTP Travel Pages

See also

List of settlements in the Karditsa regional unit

References

Populated places in Karditsa (regional unit)